Hunter's cisticola (Cisticola hunteri) is a species of bird in the family Cisticolidae.
It is found in Kenya, Tanzania, and Uganda.
Its natural habitats are tropical moist montane and high-altitude shrubland.  It is a dueting species.

References

Hunter's cisticola
Birds of East Africa
Hunter's cisticola
Taxonomy articles created by Polbot